Video Archive is a video release by Def Leppard. A compilation of promo videos, interviews, and concert footage. On DVD, it is bundled with Visualize.

Some of this material also appeared in the Visualize set.

Track list

Live from Don Valley Stadium, Sheffield (June 6, 1993)

 Opening Statements and Titles
 "Let's Get Rocked"
 "Foolin'"
 "Rocket"
 "Two Steps Behind"
 "Armageddon It"
 "Pour Some Sugar on Me"
 "Rock Of Ages"
 "Love Bites"

Videos (1993-1995)

 "When Love & Hate Collide" (Performance Only)
 "Two Steps Behind"
 "Action"
 "Miss You in a Heartbeat"
 "When Love & Hate Collide" (Epic 8 Minute Version)

Acoustic Performance From Wapentake Club, Sheffield (October 5, 1995)

 "Two Steps Behind"
 "Armageddon It"
 "When Love & Hate Collide"
 "Animal"
 "Pour Some Sugar on Me"
 "Ziggy Stardust"
 Credits (contains a portion of an acoustic performance of "All I Want Is Everything")

Def Leppard video albums
1995 video albums
Music video compilation albums
1995 compilation albums
Def Leppard compilation albums